Michael Hogan (born 1949) is a Canadian actor best known for playing Colonel Saul Tigh in the 2004 Battlestar Galactica series. Other notable roles include Billy in The Peanut Butter Solution and villainous werewolf hunter Gerard Argent in Teen Wolf. He also lent his voice to Armando-Owen Bailey in the Mass Effect series and General Tullius in The Elder Scrolls V: Skyrim game.

Biography 
Michael Hogan was born in Kirkland Lake, Ontario in 1949, raised in North Bay, Ontario and studied at National Theatre School of Canada.

Career
Hogan began his career in 1978 and has starred in numerous TV shows, plays, radio dramas and operas. He started in plays at the Shaw Festival.

He made his film debut in the Peter Fonda trucker picture High-Ballin' (1978). He and his wife soon became a popular television couple, as the stars of the 1983 Canadian series Vanderberg and the 1986 Canadian-German series The Little Vampire. In 1985, he also starred in the children's film The Peanut Butter Solution.

Hogan portrayed Jack Budyansky in Diplomatic Immunity (1990) and in Solitaire (1991). He was nominated for a  Genie Award for Best Supporting Actor for the former role and won it for the latter. In 1998, he portrayed Tony Logozzo in Cold Squad (1998). Hogan was nominated for the Gemini Award for Best Actor in a Dramatic Program or Miniseries, for the 2003 telefilm Betrayed.

From 2003 to 2009, Hogan starred as Colonel Saul Tigh, Executive Officer of the Battlestar Galactica on the Sci Fi Channel television program Battlestar Galactica. He portrayed Irwin Fairbanks in The L Word (2004–2006). He also had a recurring role on the hit MTV show Teen Wolf (2012-2017) as Gerard Argent, the werewolf-hunting grandfather of Allison Argent and the latest nemesis of main protagonist, Scott McCall.

He made guest appearances on Millennium (1997), The Outer Limits (1997),  Andromeda (2002), in the two-hour premiere of Monk (2002),Dollhouse (2009), Numb3rs (2009), Warehouse 13 (2009), Psych (2010) and the third season of the sitcom Husbands.

Hogan's movies include Road to Saddle River, Clearcut, Stella, Cowboys Don't Cry and The Cutting Edge and the telefilms Dead Man's Gun, Shadow Lake, Scorn, Shadow Realm and Nights Below Station Street, for which he received the Manitoba Motion Picture Industry Association's Blizzard Award for Best Leading Actor. He appeared in the romance horror film Red Riding Hood (2011).

Hogan has also lent his voice to the video game industry, providing the voice of Captain Armando-Owen Bailey in the role-playing games (RPG), Mass Effect 2 and Mass Effect 3, as well as the opening character, Doc Mitchell, in Fallout: New Vegas. Hogan also voiced the character General Tullius in the RPG, The Elder Scrolls V: Skyrim. Most recently, he lent his voice as Samael in the American release of the Korean massively multiplayer online role-playing game, TERA (2012).

Personal life
On February 17, 2020, Hogan sustained a brain injury after falling and hitting his head. This caused paralysis of his left side, memory loss, and dysphagia.

Filmography

Film

Television

Video games

References

External links

 

1949 births
Living people
Canadian male television actors
Canadian male film actors
Canadian male voice actors
Best Supporting Actor Genie and Canadian Screen Award winners
People from Kirkland Lake
People with traumatic brain injuries
Male actors from Ontario
Date of birth missing (living people)